Gustaf "Gösta" Wilhelm Hagelin (5 October 1897 – 13 December 1983) was a Swedish Army officer and horse rider who competed in the 1924 Summer Olympics. In 1924 he and his horse Varius won the silver medal with the Swedish eventing team after finishing twentieth in the individual eventing.

Hagelin was lieutenant colonel in the Swedish Army.

References

1897 births
1983 deaths
Swedish event riders
Olympic equestrians of Sweden
Swedish male equestrians
Equestrians at the 1924 Summer Olympics
Olympic silver medalists for Sweden
Olympic medalists in equestrian
Medalists at the 1924 Summer Olympics
Swedish Army colonels